The Tomb of Shah Jamal is the tomb of Sufi Saint Baba Shah Jamal. It is located in Lahore, Punjab, Pakistan. It can be located opposite Forman Christian (FC) College, near Muslim Town. There is a masjid built around the tomb which incorporates a graveyard.

Traditions
At the foot of the stairs leading up to the tomb, there is a regular gathering of pilgrims, who come every Thursday night and Friday morning, following a tradition that has been going on for hundreds of years. Dhol is played with devotees (dervish or fakir) dancing in a trance also known as dhamaal. The drummer Pappu Sain was the central attraction and performed on the dhol.

This performance, every Thursday night/ Friday morning, is attended by people from all walks of life—students, government officials, musicians both domestic and international, models, common folk.  It is encouraged that people wear simple, plain clothes and come covered, out of respect for the shrine.

Annual urs festival
The annual urs festival is conducted every year on the 3rd, 4th and 5th days of the Islamic month of Rabi' al-Thani (ربيع الثاني). In 2006, 300,000 people attended the 366th annual URS (anniversary celebrations) of Shah Jamal (1588-1649).

Gallery

References

External links  
 Gonga Saeen & Mithu Saeen beats the drum for Baba Shah Jamal, Photo by Yasuo Osakabe, Photographer, Yasuo Oaskabe

Sufi shrines
Shrines in Lahore
Sufi shrines in Pakistan
Mausoleums in Punjab, Pakistan